Wahpeton is a city in Richland County, in southeast North Dakota along the Bois de Sioux River at its confluence with the Otter Tail River, which forms the Red River of the North. Wahpeton is the county seat of Richland County. The population was 8,007 at the 2020 census.

Wahpeton was founded in 1869 and is the principal city of the Wahpeton Micropolitan Statistical Area, which includes all of Richland County, North Dakota and Wilkin County, Minnesota. Wahpeton's twin city is Breckenridge, Minnesota, on the other side of the river. The Bois de Sioux River and the Otter Tail River join at Wahpeton and Breckenridge to form the Red River of the North.

The North Dakota State College of Science is in Wahpeton. The local newspaper is the Wahpeton Daily News.

History

The first European explorer in the area was Jonathan Carver in 1767. He explored and mapped the Northwest at the request of Major Robert Rogers, commander of Fort Michilimackinac. This British fort at Mackinaw City, Michigan, protected the passage between Lake Michigan and Lake Huron of the Great Lakes. In 1763 the British had extended their reach in Canada and territory west of the Appalachian Mountains, taking over former French colonial territories after defeating the French in the Seven Years' War.

Carver's mission was to find the Northwest Passage, the imagined waterway to the Orient which Rogers (and many other explorers of the time) believed existed. Carver could not find what does not exist, but his account of exploration helped attract fur traders and other explorers to this territory.

More than 100 years after Carver's expedition, a U.S. government surveying party passed through the Wahpeton area. With the Civil War over, the government wanted to encourage development in the West. J. W. Blanding, a member of the expedition, was so impressed by the fertile river valley that he returned to his Wisconsin home determined to move his family and property to the Dakota Territory. Blanding so influenced other Wisconsin settlers that many had reached the Wahpeton area and homesteaded there before Blanding arranged his return.

The first settler was Morgan T. Rich. His plow turned the first furrow of rich black bottomland in 1869. When other settlers arrived, they formed a tiny community and named it Richville, commemorating both its founder and the fertile quality of the soil.

In 1871, a U.S. post office opened. At the same time, the town's name was changed to Chahinkapa, a Lakota Sioux word meaning "the end of the woods". Two years later, the county was organized and named Chahinkapa County.

Later that year the county was renamed Richland County and the town of Chahinkapa renamed Wahpeton. This was derived from the Dakota name of the local band of Dakota Indians, the Wakhpetonwan. The name in Dakota means "leaf dwellers." They adopted this name at an earlier time when they lived in the vicinity of Lake Mille Lacs, before they were displaced by the Ojibwe and pushed to the west.

Growth of the village of Wahpeton was quite slow during the first few years, but it increased rapidly in 1872 with the completion of a railroad line into Breckenridge, Minnesota, a tiny community across the Bois de Sioux River. The St. Paul and Pacific Railway (now the Great Northern) had entered the region. The railroad generated a booming business in flatboat building in both communities. Flatboats could carry freight directly from the railroad downriver via the Red River of the North (which flowed north) to northern parts of the state and to Winnipeg, Manitoba, Canada.

The railroad line attracted many more settlers to the area—both migrants from the Eastern United States, Native Americans, and new European immigrants. Germans, Bohemians, Scandinavians, and Native Americans moved to Richland County to file for homesteads. In 1874, Jacob Morvin and Joseph Sittarich opened the county's first retail store in Wahpeton. By 1876 the traffic between Wahpeton and Breckenridge had grown past the ferry's capacity. A bridge was built across the Bois de Sioux River connecting the towns.

Another flurry of growth occurred in 1880 when the St. Paul, Minneapolis, and Manitoba Railroad crossed the river and pushed its tracks on toward the northwest. By 1883 the population of Wahpeton was estimated to be as high as 1,400 people.

In 1888, the Northern Light Electric Company (NLEC) was organized here. It made Wahpeton among North Dakota's first cities to be electrified. In 1909, NLEC became the first customer of the newly founded Otter Tail Power Company. In 1913, NLEC's owner, C. B. Kidder, sold his company to Otter Tail Power and became its first general manager. In 1927, Otter Tail Power built what was then its largest power plant at Wahpeton, naming it Kidder Station. The plant was removed in 1977; the site is now a park.

In 1889, the Red River Valley University was established in Wahpeton. It later was renamed the North Dakota State College of Science.

On June 10, 1897, a lightning bolt struck the main pole in a Ringling Brothers Circus tent as it was being erected, breaking the pole and causing three deaths. The lives lost are commemorated with a monument in a graveyard south of Wahpeton.

In 1904, the U.S. government established the Wahpeton Indian School here. The boarding school operated into the 1970s. It was intended to educate Native American children from reservations and tribes in northern Minnesota, North Dakota, and northern South Dakota. It was an Indian boarding school, designed to assimilate the children to mainstream language, culture and religion. In most such schools, children were required to use English rather than their native languages (which were many among these groups), dress in Euro-American style, and practice Christianity. The school has since been transferred to an inter-tribal group, chartered under the federally recognized Sisseton-Wahpeton Dakota Oyate and funded by the Bureau of Indian Education. The tribes renamed the school Circle of Nations School and operate it, serving children in grades 4–8.

Geography
Wahpeton is located at  (46.269931, −96.610463).

The Red River forms one of the most fertile river valleys in the world. As it flows north to Canada, it forms the state boundary between North Dakota and Minnesota. Wahpeton is near the river's headwaters at the confluence of the Bois de Sioux and Otter Tail Rivers.

Climate
This climatic region is typified by large seasonal temperature differences, with warm to hot (and often humid) summers and cold (sometimes severely cold) winters. According to the Köppen Climate Classification system, Wahpeton has a humid continental climate, abbreviated "Dfb" on climate maps.

Demographics

2010 census
As of the census of 2010, there were 7,766 people, 3,151 households, and 1,717 families residing in the city. The racial makeup of the city was 92.6% White, 1.3% African American, 3.1% Native American, 0.8% Asian, 0.1% Pacific Islander, 0.3% from other races, and 1.8% from two or more races. Hispanic or Latino of any race were 2.0% of the population.

There were 3,151 households, of which 26.8% had children under age 18 living with them, 40.7% were married couples living together, 9.2% had a female householder with no husband present, 4.6% had a male householder with no wife present, and 45.5% were non-families. 36.3% of all households were made up of individuals, and 11.7% had someone living alone who was 65 or older. The average household size was 2.17 and the average family size was 2.89.

The median age in the city was 31.1. 20.3% of residents were under 18; 22.2% were between 18 and 24; 20.5% were from 25 to 44; 24.5% were from 45 to 64; and 12.6% were 65 or older. The gender makeup of the city was 51.6% male and 48.4% female.

2000 census
As of the census of 2000, there were 8,586 people, 3,254 households, and 1,867 families residing in the city. The racial makeup of the city was 95.47% White, 0.62% African American, 2.41% Native American, 0.43% Asian, 0.03% Pacific Islander, 0.12% from other races, and 0.92% from two or more races. Hispanic or Latino of any race were 0.76% of the population.

The top 6 ancestry groups in the city are German (47.4%), Norwegian (28.4%), Irish (7.1%), Swedish (5.8%), French (4.0%), English (4.0%).

There were 3,254 households, of which 30.4% had children under 18 living with them, 45.3% were married couples living together, 8.5% had a female householder with no husband present, and 42.6% were non-families. 32.7% of all households were made up of individuals, and 10.0% had someone living alone who was 65 or older. The average household size was 2.28 and the average family size was 2.97.

In the city, the population was spread out, with 21.2% under 18, 24.1% from 18 to 24, 24.2% from 25 to 44, 17.5% from 45 to 64, and 13.0% who were 65 or older. The median age was 29. For every 100 females, there were 109.8 males. For every 100 females 18 and over, there were 112.3 males.

The median income for a household in the city was $33,471, and the median income for a family was $44,645. Males had a median income of $30,199 versus $20,089 for females. The per capita income for the city was $15,293. About 7.3% of families and 13.4% of the population were below the poverty line, including 8.9% of those under 18 and 10.4% of those 65 or older.

Economy
Wahpeton is the home of several large manufacturing plants, including Woodcraft Industries, Inc., WCCO Belting, Minn-Dak Farmers Cooperative, Cargill, ComDel Innovation, Heartland Precision, Doosan/Bobcat, Masonite and Wil-Rich.

Imation Corporation operated a production facility in Wahpeton but it closed in 2009.

On May 14, 1991, Wahpeton voters approved a 1% city sales and use tax, the proceeds of which were to be dedicated solely to economic development of the City of Wahpeton and Richland County, by means of business and industrial expansion including job creation, job retention, business and industrial diversification, and the creation, fostering and maintenance of business and trade activities and facilities. The tax would become effective July 1, 1991, and sunset in five years. On June 14, 1994, voters approved to extend the sales tax 10 years to June 30, 2006. On October 14, 2003, voters approved broadening the use and extending the 1½% sales tax to June 30, 2026.

Recreation and culture

The area attracts outdoorsmen and hunters, as it is in the midst of the Central Flyway, thus providing excellent migratory waterfowl hunting.

The Bois de Sioux Golf Course is the nation's only golf course with half the course in one state and half in another. Near the golf course is Chahinkapa Park, which houses playgrounds, baseball, softball, football fields, and tennis. During the summer the large swimming pool is open. Chahinkapa Park is also home to Chahinkapa Zoo. In May 2018, Chahinkapa Zoo became home to two white rhinos.

The Richland County Historical Society Museum features Native American artifacts and displays of pioneer life. Near Wahpeton is Fort Abercrombie and the Circus Monument, erected in memory of circus workers killed by lightning there in 1897. Circus performers hold a memorial service at the monument whenever they perform in the area.

The Carmelite Monastery, in the bend of the Wild Rice River, is a few miles from Wahpeton.

On Thursday afternoons from June through October, the Twin Towns Gardeners' Market is held near the Sears/Family Dollar building in Wahpeton.

Other Wahpeton area attractions include "Wahpper" the World's Largest Catfish, at Kidder Dam, and the Bagg Bonanza Farm, a  historic bonanza farm with farm buildings and machinery. There is a mural at the corner of Dakota Avenue and 4th Street. Also downtown is the Red Door Art Gallery/Visitor's Center.

Education

Colleges
 North Dakota State College of Science

K–12
Wahpeton is served by two elementary schools, Wahpeton Middle School and Wahpeton Senior High School. There is also a private school, St. John's Elementary.

The Circle of Nations School (formerly Wahpeton Indian School), an off-reservation tribal boarding school for Native American children in grades 4 to 8, is affiliated with the Bureau of Indian Education (BIE).

High school championships
 State Class 'A' football: 1930, 1971
 State Class 'A' boys basketball: 1941, 1944, 1954, 1979
 State Class 'A' girls basketball: 1986
 State Class 'A' volleyball: 1985, 1986
 State Class 'A' girls golf: 1991
 State Class 'A' wrestling: 2007
 State Class 'A' girls indoor track and field: 1999

Transportation

Main Highways and Roads

 (works as a bypass for Wahpeton. Crosses the river just north of Breckenridge, MN, becomes  and then intersects .

Notable people
 Art Anderson, former NFL football player
 Sam Anderson, actor
 Anna Astvatsaturian Turcotte, Armenian-American writer
 Louise Erdrich (Chippewa), author, lived here as a child when her parents taught at the Indian boarding school
 Sidney Hinds, Brigadier General and Olympian
 Rose Thompson Hovick, inspired "Rose" character of musical Gypsy
 Woodrow W. Keeble, World War II and Korean War era Medal of Honor recipient
 Colin Masica, linguist
 Porter J. McCumber, former senator
 Jerome G. Miller, correctional institution reformer
 Steve Myhra, former placekicker for the Baltimore Colts
 William E. Purcell, former senator
 David Richman, North Dakota State men's basketball head coach
 Mary Shaw Shorb, research scientist
 Ryan Smith, wide receiver, Winnipeg Blue Bombers
 Russell T. Thane, long-time state senator
 John Wall, North Dakota educator and politician
 Clark Williams, state legislator

References

External links

 City of Wahpeton
 Wahpeton Public Schools
 A history of Richland County and the city of Wahpeton, North Dakota (1938?) from the Digital Horizons website

Cities in North Dakota
Wahpeton micropolitan area
Cities in Richland County, North Dakota
County seats in North Dakota
Populated places established in 1871
Dakota toponyms
1871 establishments in Dakota Territory